Shahr-e Naw Park, also known as Pārk-e Shahr-e Now, is a general public park in the Shahr-e Naw district of Kabul, Afghanistan. It is one of several original open-space parks planned by Afghan kings during the 19th century. It was recently rehabilitated and renovated by the Kabul municipality. Around the park are commercial buildings and small shops.

See also
Zarnegar Park

References

External links

Parks in Kabul